Pont-l'Évêque is a commune in the Calvados department in the Normandy region in northwestern France. It is known for Pont-l'Évêque cheese, a type of soft cheese, the oldest Normandy cheese in production.

During World War II, the town was severely damaged by a two-day battle in August 1944. On 1 January 2019, the former commune of Coudray-Rabut was merged into Pont-l'Évêque.

The town serves as the setting for Gustave Flaubert's story Un cœur simple and features heavily in the book 13 - Lucky For Some which is about the history of the 13th (Lancashire) Parachute Battalion. There are many then and now photographs as well as maps and diagrams of battles that took place in the region.

Geography and toponymy
The river Touques flows through Pont-l'Évêque, which takes its name from a bridge (pont) built over the river. Starting in the 10th century, the local bishop (évêque) took responsibility for building and repairing the bridges and roads in France. Pont-l'Évêque thus means "Bishop Bridge". It was Latinised as Pons-Episcopi. Pont-l'Évêque station has rail connections to Paris, Deauville, Évreux and Lisieux.

Population

Transport
 A13 autoroute
 A132 autoroute
 Route nationale 177
 Chemins de Fer de l'Ouest

Twin Towns
  Ottery St Mary, United Kingdom (since 1977)
  Veitshöchheim, Germany (since 1994)

Personalities
Pont-l'Évêque was the birthplace of:
 Roger de Pont L'Evêque (c.1115–1181) – Archdeacon of Canterbury, and later Archbishop of York
 Dière de Dièreville (c.1670–?) – surgeon, botanist and writer who wrote about his 1699–1700 voyage to Acadia
 Jacques Guillaume Thouret (1746–1794) – revolutionary, lawyer, president of the National Constituent Assembly
 Ferdinand Alphonse Hamelin (1796–1864) – Navy officer, Admiral and Minister of Marine

See also
Communes of the Calvados department

References

Communes of Calvados (department)